Alan John Blinken (born December 24, 1937) is an American businessman, political candidate, and former diplomat who served as the United States Ambassador to Belgium from 1993 to 1997. Blinken was also the Democratic nominee in the 2002 United States Senate election in Idaho, losing to incumbent Larry Craig.

Early life and education 
Blinken was born on December 24, 1937, in New York City, the son of Ethel (Horowitz) and Maurice Blinken. His father was a Jewish immigrant from Kyiv. His older brother Donald M. Blinken, was also a diplomat. Blinken was raised in Manhattan and Yonkers, New York, and graduated from the Horace Mann School. Blinken earned a Bachelor of Arts degree from Harvard University. Blinken studied business and economics. His thesis advisor was John Kenneth Galbraith.

Career 
After graduating from Harvard, Blinken worked in the financial services industry, serving as president of Model Roland & Co. and as managing director of Wertheim Schroder & Co. He was a director of the Belgium-based biopharmaceutical manufacturer UCB. Blinken ran for the New York State Assembly in Manhattan, but lost to Republican John Ravitz.

Blinken served as United States ambassador to Belgium from 1993 to 1997.

A longtime resident of the Upper East Side, Blinken later relocated to Sun Valley, Idaho. In 2002, he was the Democratic nominee for United States Senate in Idaho. He was defeated by incumbent Republican Larry Craig.

Personal life 
Blinken was married to Melinda Blinken (née Koch), the daughter of Hollywood producer Howard W. Koch.

Blinken is the grandson of the Ukrainian-born writer Meir Blinken, brother of Donald M. Blinken and uncle of the United States Secretary of State Antony Blinken. Blinken Auditorium at the Residential Academic Facility of The Washington Center is named after him.

Blinken and his wife resided in Ketchum, Idaho. In 2019, they hosted a fundraiser for then-candidate Joe Biden.

Election history

See also
United States Ambassador to Belgium
Foreign relations of Belgium

References

External links
Bio on UCB's web site

1937 births
Living people
Ambassadors of the United States to Belgium
Harvard University alumni
Idaho Democrats
American people of Ukrainian-Jewish descent
Jewish American people in Ohio politics
Blinken family
Horace Mann School alumni
People from Sun Valley, Idaho
People from Ketchum, Idaho
21st-century American Jews
People from the Upper East Side